Georgia's 5th congressional district is a congressional district in the U.S. state of Georgia. The district was represented by Democrat John Lewis from January 3, 1987 until his death on July 17, 2020. Kwanza Hall was elected to replace Lewis on December 1, 2020 and served until January 3, 2021 when Nikema Williams took his place. Hall was elected in a special election for the balance of Lewis' 17th term. He chose not to run in the general election for a full two-year term, which was won by Williams. 

The district's boundaries were redrawn following the 2010 census, which granted an additional congressional seat to Georgia. The first election using the new district boundaries (listed below) were the 2012 congressional elections.

Based in central Fulton and parts of DeKalb and Clayton counties, the majority black district includes almost three-fourths of Atlanta, the state capital and largest city. It also includes some of the surrounding suburbs, including East Point, Druid Hills, and Forest Park. With a Cook Partisan Voting Index rating of D+32, it is the most Democratic district in Georgia.

Counties
Fulton (Partial, see also ,  and )
DeKalb (Partial, see also  and )
Clayton (Partial, see also )

Recent results in other elections

List of members representing the district

Election results

2002

2004

2006

2008

2010

2012

2014

2016

2018

2020 special election

2020

2022

Historical district boundaries

See also

Georgia's congressional districts
List of United States congressional districts

References

 
 
 Congressional Biographical Directory of the United States 1774–present

External links
 PDF map of Georgia's 5th district at nationalatlas.gov
 Georgia's 5th district at GovTrack.us

05
1827 establishments in Georgia (U.S. state)